De Westermolen  is a smock mill in Kollumerpomp, Friesland, Netherlands which was built in 1845. The mill has been restored to working order. It is listed as a Rijksmonument, number 23746.

History

De Westermolen was built in 1845 to drain the  Ooster- en Wester- Nieuwkruisland polder. As well as draining the polder, it could also pump water into the polder. The mill worked until 1959, when a stock broke in a storm. Permission was then sought to demolish the mill, but this was refused. On 4 March 1961, the mill was bought by the municipality Kollumerland en Nieuwkruisland for ƒ1. The mill was restored at a cost of ƒ7,500. A diesel engine was placed in the mill to work the Archimedes' screw. A further restoration in 1984 by millwright Thijs Jellema of Burdaard saw the diesel engine replaced by an electric motor. Further work by Jellema in 1987 returned the mill to working order. Ownership of the mill had passed to the Monumentenstichting Kollumerland c.a. en Nieuwkruisland by 1996, when further restoration work was carried out. An electrically driven pump now stands next to the mill.

Description

De Westermolen is what the Dutch describe as a Grondzeiler. It is a two-storey smock mill on a single-storey base. There is no stage, the sails reaching down almost to ground level. The mill is winded by tailpole and winch. The smock and cap are thatched. The sails are Common sails. The sails are carried on a cast-iron windshaft which was cast by Prins van Oranje, The Hague, in 1870. The windshaft also carries the brake wheel which has 60 cogs. This drives the wallower (33 cogs) at  the top of the upright shaft. At the bottom of the upright shaft is the crown wheel, which has 41 cogs, drives a gearwheel with 42 cogs on the axle of the Archimedes' screw. The axle of the Archimedes' screw is  diameter. The screw is  diameter . It is inclined at 16.7°. Each revolution of the screw lifts  of water. The Archimedes' screw that pumped water into the polder has been removed.

Public access
De Westermolen is open on Friday mornings. It is also open on Saturday mornings if there is enough wind to work the mill.

References

Windmills in Friesland
Windmills completed in 1845
Smock mills in the Netherlands
Windpumps in the Netherlands
Rijksmonuments in Friesland
Octagonal buildings in the Netherlands